{{DISPLAYTITLE:C23H32O4S}}
The molecular formula C23H32O4S (molar mass: 404.563 g/mol) may refer to:

 6β-Hydroxy-7α-thiomethylspironolactone
 7α-Thiomethylspironolactone sulfoxide

Molecular formulas